Mulilo Renewable Energy is a South African company operating in the utility scale energy market in South Africa.

The company has been active since 2008, and has partnered two Round 1 Solar pv projects in the REIPPP program that started feeding power into the national grid in late 2014. Currently 4 round three projects are under construction in the Northern Cape province - 2 Solar Photovoltaic plants in Prieska and 2 wind farms near De Aar.

References

External links

Electric power companies of South Africa